This is a list of events in Scottish television from 1983.

Events

January
17 January – Breakfast Time, Britain's first breakfast show, launches on BBC1. The new service includes four opt-outs, which allow BBC Scotland to broadcast its own news bulletin.

February
1 February – TV-am launches, with Good Morning Britain. However this is a national service with no opt-outs for Scottish news.

March
No events.

April
No events.

May
After 15 years on air, the final edition of current affairs programme Current Account is broadcast on BBC1 Scotland.

June
9–10 June – Television coverage of the 1983 general election.

July
No events.

August
No events.

September
6 September – ITV broadcasts the STV-produced Killer. It would later be turned into a series and re-titled Taggart.

October
24 October – Sixty Minutes launches on BBC1, replacing Nationwide, and the Reporting Scotland name is dropped, becoming Scotland Sixty Minutes due to the regional news programmes being incorporated into the new programme.

November
No events.

December
No events.

Debuts

ITV
6 September – Taggart (1983–2010)

Television series
Scotsport (1957–2008)
Top Club (1971–1998)
Scotland Today (1972–2009)
Sportscene (1975–present)
The Beechgrove Garden (1978–present)
Grampian Today (1980–2009)
Take the High Road (1980–2003)
Now You See It (1981–1986)

Ending this year
21 October – Reporting Scotland (1968–1983; 1984–present)

Births
March – Mark Prendergast, actor

See also
1983 in Scotland

References

 
Television in Scotland by year
1980s in Scottish television